Mt. Rushmore Broadcasting, Inc. is a broadcasting company,

FCC Troubles
Since the change of ownership from "Elk Mountain Broadcasting" to current owner "Mount Rushmore Broadcasting", six of their stations have received large fines. Most recent penalties include a $20,000 fine for "failing to maintain the operational readiness of the EAS (Emergency Alert System) equipment (see FCC Rules/11.35(a)), as well as other equipment issues and violations and failure to maintain a complete public records file."

Sources connected to the FCC say that more and significantly higher fines/penalties are forthcoming. They continue by stating that any station owned or operated by Mt. Rushmore Broadcasting will "not likely" have their licenses renewed once they expire, due to the history of "past violations and cavalier attitude(s) towards following and maintaining" rules and regulations, and that Mt. Rushmore stations could have their broadcasting rights taken away "at almost any moment."

In a letter dated May 12, 2017, the Federal Communications Commission ruled that the license of KAWK (FM) expired "on or about" October 22, 2009 under Section 312(g) of the Communications Act of 1934. The station's license was cancelled, the call letters were deleted and all authority to operate was terminated.

Stations

Casper, Wyoming
KVOC AM 1230
KMLD FM 94.5
KHOC FM 102.5
KQLT FM 103.7
KASS FM 106.9

Rawlins, Wyoming
KRAL AM 1240*
KIQZ FM 92.7

Custer, South Dakota
KFCR AM 1490*
KAWK FM 105.1*

Hot Springs, South Dakota
KZMX (AM) 580*
KZMX-FM 96.3

*Off the air.

References

External links
KRAL and KIQZ

Radio broadcasting companies of the United States